KID Museum (Kids’ Innovation & Discovery) is a children's museum and child-oriented maker space in the Washington, D.C. suburb of Bethesda, Maryland.

In May of 2022, KID Museum opened a new location in Downtown Bethesda that provides a larger space for activities ranging from wood shop to robotics. The new space is nearly four times the size of the old space on the lower floor of Bethesda's Davis Library which will remain open for some programming. More than 330,000 people have visited the KID Museum since it opened in 2014. 

The Washington Post describes KID as "The museum’s hands-on programs teach skills such as collaboration, creativity and critical thinking, as well as such technical skills as designing and building and even using power tools."

References

Children's museums in Maryland
Tourist attractions in Montgomery County, Maryland
Museums in Montgomery County, Maryland